The Brisbane Truth newspaper was a subsidiary of Sydney Truth, and was launched in 1890.

Digitisation 
The paper has been digitised as part of the Australian Newspapers Digitisation Program  of the National Library of Australia.

References

External links
 

Truth
Truth (Newspaper)
1890 establishments in Australia
Newspapers established in 1890
Newspapers on Trove
Defunct newspapers published in Queensland
1954 disestablishments in Australia
Publications disestablished in 1954